Seranthony Ambioris Domínguez Taveras (born November 25, 1994) is a Dominican professional baseball pitcher for the Philadelphia Phillies of Major League Baseball (MLB). He signed with the Phillies as an international free agent, in 2011. Domínguez made his MLB debut in 2018.

Early life
Domínguez was born in Esperanza Valverde Mao, Dominican Republic. As to where his unusual first name comes from, Baseball America reported: "'I’m not sure where it comes from,' Seranthony Domínguez said with a laugh. 'I think it’s something my parents heard on TV.'"

Career

Philadelphia Phillies

Minor leagues
Domínguez signed with the Philadelphia Phillies as an international free agent in October 2011 for $25,000. He made his professional debut in 2012 with the DSL Phillies and spent the whole season with them, going 4–4 with a 3.48 ERA and 40 strikeouts in 67 innings in 15 games (11 starts). In 2013, he returned to the DSL where he compiled a 4–6 record and 2.96 ERA, and 58 strikeouts in 76 innings, in 14 starts. He led the Dominican Summer League in shutouts (2) and complete games (2). In 2014, he played for the GCL Phillies, for whom he pitched to a 2–2 record and 3.12 ERA with 24 strikeouts in 26 relief innings pitched.

He spent 2015 with the GCL Phillies, where he was 1–1 with a 2.35 ERA with 9 strikeouts in only 7 innings pitched. In 2016 he pitched for both the Class A Short-Season Williamsport Crosscutters and Class A Lakewood BlueClaws, with whom Domínguez had a combined 6–3 record and 2.34 ERA in 13 starts with 65 strikeouts in 65 innings.  

In 2017 he pitched for the Class A-Advanced Clearwater Threshers, and compiled a 4–4 record and 3.61 ERA with 75 strikeouts in 62 innings in 15 games (13 starts), averaging 10.8 strikeouts per 9 innings. He was a 2017 Florida State League Mid-Season All Star with Clearwater. The Phillies added him to their 40-man roster after the 2017 season. In the 2017 off-season, the Phillies organization told him he was being converted into a relief pitcher.

He began 2018 with the Double-A Reading Fightin Phils, going 1–2 with a 2.08 ERA with 18 strikeouts in 13 innings in 8 games, averaging 12.5 strikeouts per 9 innings, and was promoted to the Triple-A Lehigh Valley IronPigs in late April for whom he was 1–0 with a 0.00 ERA in 3 games. Between the two minor league teams, in 16 innings Domínguez gave up 8 hits and 2 walks, as he had 21 strikeouts.

Major leagues

Domínguez was promoted to the Phillies on May 7, 2018, and made his MLB debut the same night. He became the only major league reliever in recorded baseball history (dating back to 1908) to record at least two outs and allow no runs, hits, or walks in his first five major-league appearances.  He also became the first pitcher in recorded history to not allow a run, hit, or walk in his first six appearances. He recorded his first career save against the St. Louis Cardinals on May 19, and his first win on May 26. Domínguez tied the all-time record for most perfect appearances (8) in a pitcher's first 11 games, and pitched more innings in those games (10) than any of the other pitchers with whom he was tied. His 0.65 WHIP through the All-Star break (min. 30.0 IP) was the lowest ever by any Phillie .

In 2018 with the Phillies, he was 2–5 with 16 saves and a 2.95 ERA, and 74 strikeouts in 58 innings, averaging 11.5 strikeouts per 9 innings. Dominguez ranked in the top 25 in major league baseball (minimum 50 innings) in both strikeout rate and in ground-ball rate. He struck out 32% of batters, best among rookies with at least 55 innings pitched. He also limited all batters to a .156 batting average and 0.93 WHIP (each 4th-best among NL relievers with 50 or more innings pitched), and batters to a .163 batting average in “high-leverage” situations, as calculated by Baseball-Reference. Batters had a 66.4% contact percentage against him, second-lowest in the NL among pitchers with at least 50 innings pitched. His 16 saves tied Jack Meyer (1955) for the most by any Phillies rookie reliever. Baseball America named him to its 2018 MLB All-Rookie Team, and he was named to Baseball Digest's Rookie All-Star team.

In 2019 he was 3–0 with a 4.74 ERA in  innings over 27 relief appearances during which he struck out 29 batters, averaging 10.6 strikeouts per 9 innings. His season ended early with him on the injured list, due to a damaged ulnar collateral ligament in his right elbow.

Dominguez underwent Tommy John surgery on July 30, 2020, more than a year after he was initially placed on the injured list. On February 17, 2021, Dominguez was placed on the 60-day injured list as he continued to recover from Tommy John surgery. On September 1, Dominguez was activated off of the injured list.

In the 2022 regular season, he was 6–5 with nine saves and a 3.00 ERA, as in 54 innings he struck out 61 batters over 54 relief appearances.

On February 16, 2023, Domínguez signed a two-year, $7.25 million contract extension with the Phillies.

Pitching style
Domínguez throws 4 pitches, a four-seam fastball, a sinker, both of which can reach up to 101 mph (miles per hour). His primary off-speed pitch is a slider that averages 89 mph and has generated a whiff rate of above 50% since his debut in 2018. He also throws a seldom-used changeup at 90-92 mph.

References

External links

1994 births
Living people
Major League Baseball players from the Dominican Republic
Major League Baseball pitchers
Philadelphia Phillies players
Dominican Summer League Phillies players
Florida Complex League Phillies players
Williamsport Crosscutters players
Lakewood BlueClaws players
Gigantes del Cibao players
Clearwater Threshers players
Reading Fightin Phils players
Lehigh Valley IronPigs players